The Battle of Biskupice was a battle between the Kuruc (Hungarians) and the Danish auxiliaries of the Habsburg army on 21 April 1704.

The Austrian commander Hannibal Heister in March 1704 merged with the troops (Germans, Danes, Serbs) near Komárom (present-day Komárno, Slovakia). The Austrian plane was the cleaning of the Great Rye Island up the Kurucs. This region he joined Rákóczi in 1703. The Kuruc forces threatened Pressburg and also Komárom.

In Pressburg being general Johann von Ritschan, but in spring was ordered back to Moravia. Because Heister sent to Pressburg reinforcements: 1400 Danish soldiers under German colonel Peter Viard and Danish mayor Adam Frederik Trampe.

However, the Danes reached Pressburg. The Kuruc army also stormed the ramparts near Gutta (present-day Kolárovo, Slovakia).

On 28 April, in the battle of Nárazd, Heister pushed back the Kuruc army.

Sources 
 Bánlaky József: A magyar nemzet hadtörténelme – Heister május havi hadműveletei gróf Bercsényi Miklós és gróf Eszterházy Antal ellen.
 A Csallóköz rövid története
 Et dansk korps i østrigsk tjeneste 1704-09 (milhist.dk)

Battles involving Hungary
Battles involving Denmark
Military history of Hungary
Slovakia under Habsburg rule
1704 in the Habsburg monarchy
18th century in Hungary
Conflicts in 1704
Rákóczi's War of Independence
History of Bratislava